Ashendon is a suburb of Perth, Western Australia, located within the City of Armadale. It was gazetted in 2006 and was formerly part of Karragullen. The main road through Ashendon is McNess Drive, by which the main public entrance to the Canning Dam weir and picnic area can be accessed.

References

External links

Suburbs of Perth, Western Australia
Suburbs in the City of Armadale